Muhammad Mohaiminul Islam (11 September 1941 – 14 July 2020) was a Bangladeshi military officer, chief of staff of Bangladesh Navy from 5 June 1991 to 3 June 1995.

Early life 
Islam was born on 11 September 1941. In 1959, he joined Pakistan Navy as a cadet and was commissioned in 1963. He studied at the College of Naval Command and Staff in Naval War College in the United States.

Career 
Islam was the deputy chief of naval staff. He served as the Chief of naval staff from 1991 to 1995.

Death 
Islam died from COVID-19 complications during the COVID-19 pandemic in Bangladesh on 14 July 2020.

References

|-

Bangladeshi Navy admirals
Chiefs of Naval Staff (Bangladesh)
Pakistan Navy officers
1941 births
2020 deaths
Deaths from the COVID-19 pandemic in Bangladesh